Standing Tall is the fourteenth album by the jazz group The Crusaders after they changed their name from The Jazz Crusaders, and their third studio album with MCA Records. It features singer Joe Cocker as guest artist on two tracks: the 1981 Grammy-nominated song "I'm So Glad I'm Standing Here Today" and "This Old World's Too Funky for Me."

Track listing
"Standing Tall" (Stix Hooper) 6:46
"I'm So Glad I'm Standing Here Today" (Joe Sample, Will Jennings) 5:02
"Sunshine in Your Eyes" (Sample) 6:11
"This Old World's Too Funky For Me" (Sample, Jennings) 5:25
"Luckenbach, Texas (Back to the Basics of Love)" (Chips Moman, Bobby Emmons) 4:23
"The Longest Night" (Sample) 6:24
"Reprise (I'm So Glad I'm Standing Here Today) (Instrumental)" (Sample. Jennings) 2:59

References

1980 albums
MCA Records albums
The Crusaders albums